Epizeuxis is a genus of moths of the family Noctuidae, it is considered to be a synonym of Idia by many authors, but some retain it as a valid genus. If treated as valid, it contains at least the type species Epizeuxis calvaria Denis & Schiffermüller, 1775.

References
Natural History Museum Lepidoptera genus database

Herminiinae